Greenville is the name of several places:

Canada 
Laxgalts'ap, British Columbia, formerly named Greenville
Greenville, Nova Scotia, in Yarmouth County
Greenville Station, Nova Scotia, in Cumberland County
Lower Greenville, Nova Scotia, in Cumberland County

United States 
Greenville, Alabama
Greenville, California, in Plumas County
Greenville, Yuba County, California
Greenville, Delaware
Greenville, Florida
Greenville, Georgia
Greenville, Illinois
 Federal Correctional Institution, Greenville
Greenville, Indiana, in Floyd County
Greenville, Sullivan County, Indiana
Greenville, Wells County, Indiana
Greenville, Iowa
Greenville, Kentucky
Manchester, Kentucky, which was founded as Greenville
Greenville, Maine, a town
Greenville (CDP), Maine, a census-designated place within the town
Greenville, Massachusetts
Greenville, Michigan
Greenville, Mississippi, ghost town known as "Old Greenville" in Jefferson County
Greenville, Mississippi, in Washington County
Greenville, Missouri
Greenville, New Hampshire, a town
Greenville (CDP), New Hampshire, a census-designated place within the town
Greenville, Jersey City, New Jersey
Greenville, New York (disambiguation) 
Greenville, North Carolina
Greenville, Ohio
Greenville, Oklahoma
Greenville, Oregon (disambiguation)
Greenville, Pennsylvania
Greenville Township, Somerset County, Pennsylvania
Greenville, Rhode Island
Greenville, South Carolina
Greenville, Texas
Greenville, Utah
Greenville, Virginia
Greenville (Raccoon's Ford, Virginia), a historic plantation home
Greenville, Wisconsin, a town
Greenville (community), Wisconsin, an unincorporated community in the town of Greenville
Greencastle, West Virginia, also called Greenville

United Kingdom 
Greenville, County Antrim, a townland in County Antrim, Northern Ireland

Liberia 
Greenville, Liberia

See also
Greeneville (disambiguation)
Greensville (disambiguation)
Grenville (disambiguation)
List of places named for Nathanael Greene